Oguta Lake is a lean 'finger lake' formed by the damming of the lower Njaba River with alluvium. it is the largest natural lake in Imo State, Southeastern Nigeria; within the equatorial rainforest region of Niger Delta. Oguta Lake's catchment area comprises the drainage area of the Njaba River and a part of the River Niger floodplain in the region south of Onitsha.

Location
The stream from Njaba River is the major inflow to Oguta Lake. The other three tributaries are Awbana, Utu and Orashi. The Orashi River flows past Oguta Lake in its southwestern portion.

Economic importance
The lake is important to the people of oil-rich Njaba River basin including Oguta, Orsu, Mgbidi, Nkwesi, Osemotor, Nnebukwu, Mgbele, Awa Awo-Omamma Akabo as a source of water, fish, tourism and an outlet for sewerage. Uhamiri is the goddess of the lake.

Trade route
The river route Njaba and Orashi via Oguta Lake to the coast, passing through Awo-omamma, Mgbidi, Oguta, Ndoni, Abonnema, Degema made Oguta, Osemotor, Awo-omamma and surrounding towns  important  commercial  centres  of  international trade mainly for oil palm. Oguta Lake also served as a Biafran army marine base during the Nigerian Civil War.

Pictures of Oguta Lake

Footnotes

External links
World lakes database

Lakes of Nigeria
Tourist attractions in Imo State
Geography of Nigeria
Imo State
Ramsar sites in Nigeria